Chevron Corporation is an American multinational energy corporation predominantly in oil and gas. The second-largest direct descendant of Standard Oil, and originally known as the Standard Oil Company of California (shortened to Socal or CalSo), it is headquartered in San Ramon, California, and active in more than 180 countries. Within oil and gas, Chevron is vertical integrated and is involved in hydrocarbon exploration, production, refining, marketing and transport, chemicals manufacturing and sales, and power generation.

Chevron traces its history back to the 1870s. The company grew quickly after the breakup of Standard Oil by acquiring companies and partnering with others, eventually becoming one of the Seven Sisters that dominated the global petroleum industry from the mid-1940s to the 1970s. In 1985, Socal merged with the Pittsburgh-based Gulf Oil and rebranded as Chevron; the newly merged company later merged with Texaco in 2001. Today, Chevron manufactures and sells fuels, lubricants, additives, and petrochemicals, primarily in Western North America,  the U.S. Gulf Coast, Southeast Asia, South Korea and Australia. In 2018, the company produced an average of 791,000 barrels of net oil-equivalent per day in United States.

Chevron is one of the largest companies in the world and the second largest oil company based in the United States by revenue, only behind fellow Standard Oil descendant ExxonMobil. Chevron ranked 16th on the Fortune 500 in 2022 with revenues of US$162.5 billion, which also ranked it 37th on the Fortune Global 500. The company is also the last-remaining oil and gas component of the Dow Jones Industrial Average since ExxonMobil's exit from the index in 2020.

Chevron has been subject to numerous controversies arising out of its activities, the most notable of which being related to its activities and inherited liabilities from its acquisition of Texaco in the Lago Agrio oil field, which include allegations of both Chevron and Texaco collectively dumping 18 billion tons of toxic waste and spilling 17 million gallons of petroleum. Chevron and Texaco's activities were the subject of a lawsuit Chevron lost to Ecuadorian residents defended in Ecuadorian court by Steven Donziger. Due to accusations of Donziger bribing the Ecuadorian court and the subsequent disbarment and criminal contempt charges against Donziger, Chevron was accused by environmentalists and human rights groups of jailing Donziger and compelling the US government to deny Donziger due process of law.

History

Predecessors

Star Oil and Pacific Coast Oil Company 
One of Chevron's early predecessors, "Star Oil", discovered oil at the Pico Canyon Oilfield in the Santa Susana Mountains north of Los Angeles in 1876. The 25 barrels of oil per day well marked the discovery of the Newhall Field, and is considered by geophysicist Marius Vassiliou as the beginning of the modern oil industry in California. Energy analyst Antonia Juhasz has said that while Star Oil's founders were influential in establishing an oil industry in California, Union Mattole Company discovered oil in the state eleven years prior.

In September 1879, Charles N. Felton, Lloyd Tevis, George Loomis and others created the "Pacific Coast Oil Company", which acquired the assets of Star Oil with $1 million in funding. Pacific Coast Oil eventually became the largest oil interest in California, and in 1900, John D. Rockefeller's Standard Oil acquired Pacific Coast Oil  for $761,000. Pacific Coast operated independently and retained its name until 1906, when it was merged with a Standard Oil subsidiary, taking on the name "Standard Oil of California", shortened to "California Standard" or "CalSo".

Texaco 

Since the acquisition of the Pacific Coast Oil Company by Standard Oil, the Standard descendant had traditionally worked closely with Texaco for 100 years, before acquiring Texaco outright in 2001. Originally known as the Texas Fuel Company (later the Texas Company), Texaco was founded in Beaumont, Texas as an oil equipment vendor by "Buckskin Joe". The founder's nickname came from being harsh and aggressive. Texas Fuel worked closely with Chevron. In 1936, it formed a joint venture with California Standard named Caltex, to drill and produce oil in Saudi Arabia. According to energy analyst and activist shareholder Antonia Juhasz, the Texas Fuel Company and California Standard were often referred to as the "terrible twins" for their cutthroat business practices.

Formation of the Chevron name

In 1911, the federal government broke Standard Oil into several pieces under the Sherman Antitrust Act. One of those pieces, Standard Oil Co. (California), went on to become Chevron. It became part of the "Seven Sisters", which dominated the world oil industry in the early 20th century. In 1926, the company changed its name to Standard Oil Co. of California (SOCAL). By the terms of the breakup of Standard Oil, at first Standard of California could use the Standard name only within its original geographic area of the Pacific coast states, plus Nevada and Arizona; outside that area, it had to use another name.

Today, Chevron is the owner of the Standard Oil trademark in 16 states in the western and southeastern United States. Since American trademark law operates under a use-it-or-lose-it rule, the company owns and operates one Standard-branded Chevron station in each state of the area.  However, though Chevron (as CalSo) acquired Kyso in the 1960s, its status in Kentucky is unclear after Chevron withdrew its brand from retail sales from Kentucky in July 2010.

The 'Chevron' name came into use for some of its retail products in the 1930s. The name "Calso" was also used from 1946 to 1955, in states outside its native West Coast territory.

Standard Oil Company of California ranked 75th among United States corporations in the value of World War II military production contracts.

In 1933, Saudi Arabia granted California Standard a concession to find oil, which led to the discovery of oil in 1938. In 1948, California Standard discovered the world's largest oil field in Saudi Arabia, Ghawar Field. California Standard's subsidiary, California-Arabian Standard Oil Company, grew over the years and became the Arabian American Oil Company (ARAMCO) in 1944. In 1973, the Saudi government began buying into ARAMCO. By 1980, the company was entirely owned by the Saudis, and in 1988, its name was changed to Saudi Arabian Oil Company—Saudi Aramco.

Standard Oil of California and Gulf Oil merged in 1984, which was the largest merger in history at that time. To comply with U.S. antitrust law, California Standard divested many of Gulf's operating subsidiaries, and sold some Gulf stations in the eastern United States and a Philadelphia refinery which has since closed.  Among the assets sold off were Gulf's retail outlets in Gulf's home market of Pittsburgh, where Chevron lacks a retail presence but does retain a regional headquarters there as of 2013, partially for Marcellus Shale-related drilling. The same year, Standard Oil of California also took the opportunity to change its legal name to 'Chevron Corporation', since it had already been using the well-known "Chevron" retail brand name for decades. Chevron would sell the Gulf Oil trademarks for the entire U.S. to Cumberland Farms, the parent company of Gulf Oil LP, in 2010 after Cumberland Farms had a license to the Gulf trademark in the Northeastern United States since 1986.

In 1996, Chevron transferred its natural gas gathering, operating and marketing operation to NGC Corporation (later Dynegy) in exchange for a roughly 25% equity stake in NGC. In a merger completed February 1, 2000, Illinova Corp. became a wholly owned subsidiary of Dynegy Inc. and Chevron's stake increased up to 28%. However, in May 2007, Chevron sold its stake in the company for approximately $985 million, resulting in a gain of $680 million.

Acquisitions and diversification 
The early 2000s saw Chevron engage in many mergers, acquisitions, and sales. The first largest of which was the $45 billion acquisition of Texaco, announced on October 15, 2000. The acquisition created second-largest oil company in the United States and the world's fourth-largest publicly traded oil company with a combined market value of approximately $95 billion. Completed on October 9, 2001, Chevron temporarily renamed itself to ChevronTexaco between 2001 and 2005; after the company reverted its name to Chevron, Texaco became used as a brand by the company for some of its fueling stations.

2005 also saw Chevron purchase Unocal Corporation for $18.4 billion, increasing the company's petroleum and natural gas reserves by about 15%. Because of Unocal's large South East Asian geothermal operations, Chevron became a large producer of geothermal energy. The deal did not include Unocal's former retail operations including the Union 76 trademark, as it had sold that off to Tosco Corporation in 1997. The 76 brand is currently owned by Phillips 66, unaffiliated with Chevron.

Chevron and the Los Alamos National Laboratory started a cooperation in 2006, to improve the recovery of hydrocarbons from oil shale by developing a shale oil extraction process named Chevron CRUSH. In 2006, the United States Department of the Interior issued a research, development and demonstration lease for Chevron's demonstration oil shale project on public lands in Colorado's Piceance Basin. In February 2012, Chevron notified the Bureau of Land Management and the Department of Reclamation, Mining and Safety that it intends to divest this lease.

Starting in 2010, Chevron began to reduce its retail footprint and expand in domestic natural gas. In July 2010, Chevron ended retail operations in the Mid-Atlantic United States by removing the Chevron and Texaco names from 1,100 stations.  In 2011, Chevron acquired Pennsylvania based Atlas Energy Inc. for $3.2 billion in cash and an additional $1.1 billion in existing debt owed by Atlas. Three months later, Chevron acquired drilling and development rights for another 228,000 acres in the Marcellus Shale from Chief Oil & Gas LLC and Tug Hill, Inc.In September 2013, Total S.A. and its joint venture partner agreed to buy Chevron's retail distribution business in Pakistan for an undisclosed amount. In October 2014, Chevron announced that it would sell a 30 percent holding in its Canadian oil shale holdings to Kuwait's state-owned oil company Kuwait Oil Company for a fee of $1.5 billion.

Despite these sales, Chevron continued to explore acquisitions, a trend which had reinvigorated in 2019 and extended throughout the COVID-19 pandemic. In April 2019, Chevron announced their intention to acquire Anadarko Petroleum in a deal valued at $33 billion, but decided to focus on other acquisitions shortly afterwards when a deal could not be reached. Despite the failed acquisition of Andarko, Chevron did acquire Noble Energy for $5 billion in July 2020. Chevron was not spared from the pandemic, however, as Chevron announced reductions of 10–15% of its workforce due to both the pandemic and a 2020 oil price war between Russia and Saudi Arabia. During the pandemic, Chevron considered a merger with rival ExxonMobil in 2020 during the early stages of the COVID-19 pandemic that drove oil demand sharply down. It would have been one of the biggest corporate mergers in history, and a combined Chevron and ExxonMobil (dubbed "Chexxon" by Reuters) would have been the second biggest oil company in the world, trailing only Saudi Aramco. Later in the pandemic, Chevron began requiring some employees, namely expatriate employees, those working overseas, and workers on U.S.-flagged ships, to receive COVID-19 vaccinations after having some key operations, the off-shore platforms off the Gulf of Mexico and Permian Basin for example. The requirement will begin for workers off the Gulf of Mexico on the first of November.

In the 2020s, Chevron's primary focus was on alternative energy solutions, gradual pullouts from Africa and Southeast Asia, and an increased focus on the Americas with a lessened albeit still present interest in natural gas. Chevron in February 2020 joined Marubeni Corporation and WAVE Equity Partners in investing in Carbon Clean Solutions, a company that provides portable carbon capture technology for the oil field and other industrial facilities. Two years later, Chevron announced that they will acquire Renewable Energy Group, a biodiesel production company based in Ames, Iowa. The acquisition was completed just under 4 months later on June 13.

In the Americas, Chevron acquired natural gas company Beyond6, LLC (B6) and its network of 55 compressed natural gas stations across the United States from Mercuria in November 2022. However, Chevron's largest American moves in the 2020s were in Venezuela, as the Biden administration relaxed restrictions on Chevron from pumping oil in the South American nation, originally imposed due to corruption scandals and human rights violations by Venezuelan president Nicolás Maduro. The relaxed restrictions, however, came with severe limitations, including provisions which prohibited Chevron from selling to Russian or Iranian-affiliated agencies and from allowing any direct profits to go to Venezuelan oil company PDVSA.

On January 5, 2022, Chevron temporarily decreased production in Kazakhstan's Tengiz Field due to the 2022 Kazakh protests, which were motivated by heavy oil price increases. Later that month, Chevron also announced it would end all operations in Myanmar, citing rampant human rights abuses and deteriorating rule of law since the 2021 Myanmar coup d'état. A statement released by the company on its website stated while Chevron was committed to an orderly exit which ensures it can still provide energy to Southeast Asia, Chevron remains firmly opposed to the human rights violations committed by the current military rule in Myanmar. Also in 2022, Chevron was reported to explore the sale of stakes in three fields located in Equatorial Guinea. It was suggested by Reuters that the sales are intended to attract smaller oil companies.

Chevron, however, did not do business in the 2020s without controversy and regulatory obstacles. Chevron Phillips Chemical, a company jointly owned by Chevron and Phillips 66, agreed to pay $118 million in March 2022 as a result of violating the Clean Air Act at three of its chemical production plants in Texas. According to the United States' Department of Justice and Environmental Protection Agency, Chevron and Phillips failed to properly flare at the plants, causing excess air pollution. The companies agreed to add pollution control systems to the plants as well.

Despite the major oil and gas companies, including Chevron, reporting sharp rises in interim revenues and profits due to Russia's 2022 invasion of Ukraine, the world's largest oil companies received immense backlash for such profits. In total, Chevron made $246.3 billion USD in revenue and $36.5 billion in profit within 2022, both of which are records for the company. In addition, days before the company reported its full year earnings, Chevron increased its dividend and announced a $75 billion stock buyback program, a move which attracted a heated response from the Biden administration as well as from news commentators within the United States.

Corporate image

Logo evolution 
The first logo featured the legend "Pacific Coast Oil Co.", the name adopted by the company when it was established in 1879. Successive versions showed the word 'Standard' (for "The Standard Oil of California"). In 1968, the company introduced the word 'Chevron' (which was introduced as a brand in the 1930s) for the first time in its logo. In July 2014, the Chevron Corporation logo design was officially changed, although it has been used since 2000. By 2015, the logo had been changed multiple times, with three different color schemes applied in the logo. The logo was gray, then blue, and then turned red before returning to the silver gray it is today.

"Human Energy" 
Chevron today is well known for its slogan "the human energy company", a campaign first launched in September 2007. In a corporate blog, Chevron states "human energy" was chosen as their campaign's slogan and focus because "human energy captures our positive spirit in delivering energy to a rapidly changing world". The slogan remains prominent in Chevron advertising, and Chevron has derived from this slogan to use phrases in marketing such as "it's only human".

Operations 
As of December 31, 2018, Chevron had approximately 48,600 employees (including about 3,600 service station employees). Approximately 24,800 employees (including about 3,300 service station employees), or 51 percent, were employed in U.S. operations. 

Chevron's dominant regions of production are North America, which produces 1.2 billion barrels of oil equivalent (BBOE), and Eurasia, which produces 1.4 BBOE. Chevron's Eurasian-Pacific operations are concentrated in the United Kingdom, Southeast Asia, Kazakhstan, Australia, Bangladesh, and greater China. Chevron additionally operates in South America, the west coast of sub-Saharan Africa (mainly Nigeria and Angola), Egypt, and Iraq; these four regions collectively produce 0.4 BBOE. Chevron's largest revenue products are shale and tight, though produces considerable revenue from heavy oil, deepwater offshore drilling, conventional oil, and liquefied natural gas.

In October 2015, Chevron announced that it is cutting up to 7,000 jobs, or 11 percent of its workforce. Because of the COVID-19 pandemic and 2020 Russia–Saudi Arabia oil price war, Chevron announced reductions of 10–15% of its workforce.

Upstream
Chevron's oil and gas exploration and production operations, which in the oil and gas industry are considered as "upstream" operations, are primarily in the US, Australia, Nigeria, Angola, Kazakhstan, and the Gulf of Mexico.  As of December 31, 2018, the company's upstream business reported worldwide net production of 2.930 million oil-equivalent barrels per day.

In 2010, Chevron was the fourth-largest producer in the region. In February 2011, Chevron celebrated the production of its 5 billionth barrel of Permian Basin oil. The Gulf of Mexico is where the company's deepest offshore drilling takes place at Tahiti and Blind Faith. The company also explored and drilled in the Marcellus Shale formation under several northeastern US states; these operations were sold to the Pittsburgh-based natural gas firm EQT in 2020.

Chevron's largest single resource project is the $43 billion Gorgon Gas Project in Australia. It also produces natural gas from Western Australia.  The $43 billion project was started in 2010, and was expected to be brought online in 2014. The project includes construction of a 15 million tonne per annum liquefied natural gas plant on Barrow Island, and a domestic gas plant with the capacity to provide 300 terajoules per day to supply gas to Western Australia. It is also developing the Wheatstone liquefied natural gas development in Western Australia. The foundation phase of the project is estimated to cost $29 billion; it will consist of two LNG processing trains with a combined capacity of 8.9 million tons per annum, a domestic gas plant and associated offshore infrastructure. In August 2014 a significant gas-condensate discovery at the Lasseter-1 exploration well in WA-274-P in Western Australia, in which Chevron has a 50% interest was announced. The company also has an interest in the North West Shelf Venture, equally shared with five other investors including BP, BHP Petroleum, Shell, Mitsubishi/Mitsui and Woodside. Presently, Chevron is looking to convert its Gorgon Island operations from upstream production to carbon capture and storage.

In the onshore and near-offshore regions of the Niger Delta, Chevron operates under a joint venture with the Nigerian National Petroleum Corporation, operating and holding a 40% interest in 13 concessions in the region. In addition, Chevron operates the Escravos Gas Plant and the Escravos gas-to-liquids plant.

Chevron has interests in four concessions in Angola, including offshore two concessions in Cabinda province, the Tombua–Landana development and the Mafumeira Norte project, operated by the company.  It is also a leading partner in Angola LNG plant.

In Kazakhstan, Chevron participate the Tengiz and Karachaganak projects. In 2010, Chevron became the largest private shareholder in the Caspian Pipeline Consortium pipeline, which transports oil from the Caspian Sea to the Black Sea.

As of 2013, the Rosebank oil and gas field west of Shetland was being evaluated by Chevron and its partners. Chevron drilled its discovery well there in 2004. Production is expected in 2015 if a decision is made to produce from the field. The geology and weather conditions are challenging.

Midstream
As of 2019, outside of maritime shipping, Chevron did not own significant midstream assets; that year it attempted to purchase Anadarko Petroleum, which owned pipelines, but was outbid by Occidental Petroleum.  In 2021, Chevron completed its purchase of Noble Midstream Partners LP, which has crude oil, produced water and gas gathering assets in the Permian Basin in West Texas and the DJ Basin in Colorado. Noble Midstream also has 2 crude oil terminals in the DJ Basin as well as freshwater delivery systems.

Transport 

Chevron Shipping Company, a wholly owned subsidiary, provides the maritime transport operations, marine consulting services and marine risk management services for Chevron Corporation. Chevron ships historically had names beginning with "Chevron", such as Chevron Washington and Chevron South America, or were named after former or serving directors of the company. Samuel Ginn, William E. Crain, Kenneth Derr, Richard Matzke and most notably Condoleezza Rice were among those honored, but the ship named after Rice was subsequently renamed as Altair Voyager.

Downstream

Refining 
Chevron's downstream operations manufacture and sell products such as fuels, lubricants, additives and petrochemicals. The company's most significant areas of operations are the west coast of North America, the U.S. Gulf Coast, Southeast Asia, South Korea, Australia and South Africa. The company operates approximately 19,550 retail sites in 84 countries. Chevron's Asia downstream headquarters is in Singapore, and the company operates gas stations (under the Caltex brand) within the city state, in addition to some gas stations in Western Canada. Chevron owns the trademark rights to Texaco and Caltex fuel and lubricant products.

Chevron, with equal partner Singapore Petroleum Company, also owns half of the  Singapore Refining Company (SRC) plant, a complex refinery capable of cracking crude oil. The investment was first made in 1979 when Caltex was a one-third partner.

In 2010, Chevron processed  of crude oil. It owns and operates Five active refineries in the United States (Richmond, CA, El Segundo, CA, Salt Lake City, UT, Pascagoula, MS, Pasadena, TX ). Chevron is the non-operating partner in seven joint venture refineries, located in Australia, Pakistan, Singapore, Thailand, South Korea, and New Zealand. Chevron's United States refineries are located in Gulf and Western states. Chevron also owns an asphalt refinery in Perth Amboy, New Jersey; however, since early 2008 that refinery has primarily operated as a terminal.

Chemicals 

Chevron's primary chemical business is in a 50/50 joint venture with Phillips 66, organized into the Chevron Phillips Chemical Company. Chevron also operates the Chevron Oronite Company, which develops, manufactures and sells fuel and lubricant additives.

Retail 

In the United States, the Chevron brand is the most widely used, at 6,880 locations as of September 2022 spread across 21 states. Chevron's highest concentration of stations branded as Chevron are in California (mostly in the San Francisco Bay Area, Central Valley, and Greater Los Angeles), Las Vegas, Anchorage, the Pacific Northwest (especially Seattle), Phoenix, Atlanta, the Texas Triangle, and South Florida.

Chevron also utilizes the Texaco brand within the United States, though its locations are much more sparsely-spread than that of Chevron. Texaco is used at 1,346 locations across 17 states, mostly in Washington, Texas, Louisiana, Alabama, Mississippi, Georgia, and Hawaii. Additionally, Texaco licenses its brand to Valero Energy to use in the United Kingdom, and over 730 Texaco stations exist in Britain.

Chevron primarily uses the Caltex brand outside of the United States, primarily in Southeast Asia, Hong Kong, Pakistan, New Zealand, and South Africa. In 2015, Chevron sold its 50% stake in Caltex Australia, while allowing the company to continue using the Caltex brand. In 2019, Chevron announced it would re-enter the Australian market by purchasing Puma Energy's operations in the country. The acquisition was completed in July 2020. Chevron relaunched the Caltex brand in Australia in 2022, after the expiration of Caltex Australia's license to use the Caltex brand.

Alternative energy

Chevron's alternative energy operations include geothermal solar, wind, biofuel, fuel cells, and hydrogen. In 2021 it significally increased its use of biofuel from dairy farms, like biomethane.

Chevron has claimed to be the world's largest producer of geothermal energy. The company's primary geothermal operations were located in Southeast Asia, but these assets were sold in 2017.

Prior, Chevron operated geothermal wells in Indonesia providing power to Jakarta and the surrounding area. In the Philippines, Chevron also operated geothermal wells at Tiwi field in Albay province, the Makiling-Banahaw field in Laguna and Quezon provinces.

In 2007, Chevron and the United States Department of Energy's National Renewable Energy Laboratory (NREL) started collaboration to develop and produce algae fuel, which could be converted into transportation fuels, such as jet fuel. In 2008, Chevron and Weyerhaeuser created Catchlight Energy LLC, which researches the conversion of cellulose-based biomass into biofuels. In 2013, the Catchlight plan was downsized due to competition with fossil fuel projects for funds.

Between 2006 and 2011, Chevron contributed up to $12 million to a strategic research alliance with the Georgia Institute of Technology to develop cellulosic biofuels and to create a process to convert biomass like wood or switchgrass into fuels.

In 2010, the Chevron announced a 740 kW photovoltaic demonstration project in Bakersfield, California, called Project Brightfield, for exploring possibilities to use solar power for powering Chevron's facilities. It consists of technologies from seven companies, which Chevron is evaluating for large-scale use. In Fellows, California, Chevron has invested in the 500 kW Solarmine photovoltaic solar project, which supplies daytime power to the Midway-Sunset Oil Field. In Questa, Chevron has built a 1 MW concentrated photovoltaic plant that comprises 173 solar arrays, which use Fresnel lenses. In October 2011, Chevron launched a 29-MW thermal solar-to-steam facility in the Coalinga Field to produce the steam for enhanced oil recovery. As of 2012, the project is the largest of its kind in the world.

In 2014, Chevron began reducing its investment in renewable energy technologies, reducing headcount and selling alternative energy-related assets.

In 2015, the Shell Canada Quest Energy project was launched of which Chevron Canada Limited holds a 20% share. The project is based within the Athabasca Oil Sands Project near Fort McMurray, Alberta. It is the world's first CCS project on a commercial-scale.

Corporate affairs

Finances
For the fiscal year 2011, Chevron reported earnings of 26.9 billion, with an annual revenue of 257.3 billion, an increase of 23.3% over the previous fiscal cycle. Chevron's shares traded at over $105 per share, and its market capitalization was valued at over 240 billion. As of 2018, Chevron is ranked No. 13 on the Fortune 500 rankings of the largest United States corporations by total revenue.

Headquarters and Offices

California 

Chevron's corporate headquarters are located in a 92-acre campus in San Ramon, California located at 6001 Bollinger Canyon Road. The company moved there in 2002 from its earlier headquarters at 555 Market Street in San Francisco, California, the city where it had been located since its inception in 1879.  Chevron sold its San Ramon headquarters to the local Sunset Development Co. in September 2022, from whom it originally bought the land which the Bollinger Canyon Road headquarters today stand, and is planning to lease space in San Ramon's Bishop Ranch, also owned by Sunset, as its new headquarters.

Texas 
Chevron operates from office towers in Houston, Texas, where it purchased 1500 Louisiana Street and 1400 Smith Street, the former headquarters of failed Texas energy giant Enron. Chevron also planned a new office tower in downtown Houston next to its existing properties at 1600 Louisiana Street. The building will stand 50-stories and 832 feet. Upon its completion, it would be the fourth tallest building in Houston and the first 50-story building constructed there in nearly 30 years. However, the contract with the state government of Texas that Chevron made did not require that Chevron follow through with the plans and build the office tower, and as such, Chevron announced in 2016 it had no plans to build the tower, which currently remains undeveloped as of July 2022. Upon Chevron announcing that it was selling its San Ramon headquarters in 2022 and offered to cover moving costs for employees who wishes to relocate to Texas, though, interest sparked in Chevron potentially following through with building a tower at 1600 Louisiana.

Political contributions
Since January 2011 Chevron has contributed almost $15 million on Washington lobbying. On October 7, 2012, Chevron donated $2.5 million to the Republican Congressional Leadership Fund super PAC that is closely tied to former House Speaker John Boehner.

According to watchdog group Documented, in 2020 Chevron contributed $50,000 to the Rule of Law Defense Fund, a fund-raising arm of the Republican Attorneys General Association.

CEOs 
Chevron's current chairman and CEO is Mike Wirth, holding the offices since 2018. Chevron's former CEOs are:

 Harold J. Haynes (1969-1981)
 George M. Keller (1981–1989)
 Kenneth T. Derr (1989–2000)
 Dave O'Reilly (2000-2009)
 John S. Watson (2010–2018)
 Mike Wirth (2018–present)

Current Board of directors
 Wanda Austin
 John B. Frank
 Alice P. Gast
 Enrique Hernandez Jr.
 Marillyn Hewson
 Jon M. Huntsman Jr.
 Charles Moorman
 Dambisa Moyo
 Debra Reed-Klages
 Ronald Sugar (Lead independent director)
 Inge Thulin
 Jim Umpleby
 Mike Wirth (Chairman & CEO)

Controversies

Chevron has been widely criticized and attacked for scandals, accidents, and activities mostly related to climate change. Chevron has been fined by the governments of Angola, for oil spills within its waters, and the United States through its EPA for violations of the US Clean Air Act and pollutive activities arising out of its Richmond Refinery in California. In terms of total pollution released by the company, a 2019 report totaled Chevron's emissions of carbon dioxide to over 43 billion tons. On multiple instances, authorities in oil-heavy countries have fired rounds onto protestors against Chevron.

Lago Agrio and Steven Donziger 

Chevron's most widely-known scandal involves Texaco's activities in the Lago Agrio oil field in Ecuador, which Chevron is deemed responsible for due to its acquisition of Texaco in 2001. Chevron has been most widely criticized for its handling of litigation against it filed by residents of the Lago Agrio region, which included what activists see as the "jailing" of Lago Agrio lawyer Steven Donziger. Protestors also frequently hold an annual Anti-Chevron day, usually held within a week of Chevron's annual meeting of shareholders.

See also

 Chevron U.S.A., Inc. v. Natural Resources Defense Council, Inc.
 Climate appraisal
 Climate risk management
 Global warming
 Jack 2
 Patent encumbrance of large automotive NiMH batteries
 Texaco
 Trans-Caribbean pipeline

Notes

References

External links

 

 
Multinational oil companies
Oil companies of the United States
Chemical companies of the United States
Algal fuel producers
Automotive fuel retailers
Gas stations in Canada
Gas stations in the United States
Companies based in San Ramon, California
Automotive companies of the United States
Multinational companies headquartered in the United States
Petroleum in California
Companies in the Dow Jones Industrial Average
Companies listed on the New York Stock Exchange
Retail companies established in 1879
Non-renewable resource companies established in 1879
American companies established in 1879
1879 establishments in California
Corporate crime